Xaçınabad (also, Khachinstroy) is a village and the least populous municipality in the Beylagan Rayon of Azerbaijan.  It has a population of 195.

References 

Populated places in Beylagan District